The global COVID-19 pandemic arrived in Europe with its first confirmed case in Bordeaux, France, on 24 January 2020, and subsequently spread widely across the continent. By 17 March 2020, every country in Europe had confirmed a case, and all have reported at least one death, with the exception of Vatican City.

Italy was the first European country to experience a major outbreak in early 2020, becoming the first country worldwide to introduce a national lockdown. By 13 March 2020, the World Health Organization (WHO) declared Europe the epicentre of the pandemic and it remained so until the WHO announced it was overtaken by South America on 22 May. By 18 March 2020, lockdowns introduced in Europe affected more than 250 million people. Despite deployment of COVID-19 vaccines, Europe became the pandemic's epicentre once again in late 2021. On 11 January 2022, Dr. Hans Kluge, the WHO Regional Director for Europe said, "more than 50 percent of the population in the region will be infected with Omicron in the next six to eight weeks".

As the outbreak became a major crisis across Europe, national and European Union responses have led to debate over restrictions of civil liberties and the extent of European Union solidarity.

As of 20 May 2022, Europe is the most affected continent in the world. Most affected countries in Europe include France, Germany, the United Kingdom and Russia.

International comparisons 
In March 2022, The Lancet published a study comparing excess mortality rates per 100,000 population, in 191 countries in the world, over the first two years of the pandemic (2020 and 2021). The study showed that amongst the major western European countries, those with the highest rates were Italy with 227, Portugal 202, Spain 187, Belgium 147, and the Netherlands 140. The average was 140 and below that were the United Kingdom at 127, France 124, and Germany 121 - the difference between these three was not statistically significant - and that Ireland (13) and the Scandinavian countries had lower rates.

Economic activity decreased by almost 4% in the majority of sub-regions in Europe in 2020, which was similar to the global average of 3.2%. However, the variance between nations is prominent. The high infection and mortality rates of the pandemic in countries in the Western Balkans, the Eastern Neighbourhood, and Central and Eastern Europe meant they faced deeper recessions.

From 2019 to 2020, there was also a difference in how EU countries were adapting to new COVID-19 regulations, one of them being work from home. The proportion of EU enterprises employing advanced digital technology in their operations expanded dramatically during that time. From 2020 to 2021, this percentage remained relatively stable, reaching 61% in 2021, compared to 63% in 2020 and 58% in 2019.

Since the beginning of 2020, EU enterprises that embraced advanced digital technology and invested in becoming more digital during the pandemic have increased the number of employees they employ. The number of non-digital enterprises that downsized was also greater than the share of non-digital firms that had positive job growth. Non-digital companies had a negative net employment balance.

The Czech Republic was the top-performing EU country for the usage of advanced digital technologies during the pandemic. Finland was the top performing EU country in terms of digital infrastructure and the use of formal strategic business monitoring.  Austria is leading digitalization adoption during the COVID-19 pandemic. Cyprus is leading software and data investment. Sweden is at the top for investing in digital training for their employees.

Statistics by country and territory 

In late August, 88% of COVID-19 deaths in Europe were among people over age 65, according to a 30 August report from the WHO.

Pandemic by country and territory

Albania

Andorra

Austria

Belarus

Belgium

Bosnia and Herzegovina

Bulgaria

Croatia 

On 25 February, Croatia confirmed its first case, a 26-year-old man who had been in Milan, Italy. On 26 February, two new cases were confirmed, one being the twin brother of the first. In March 2020, a cluster of cases were reported in numerous Croatian cities. On 12 March, the first recovery was reported, and on 18 March the first death from the virus was confirmed. On 19 March, the number of recorded cases surpassed 100. On 21 March, it surpassed 200. On 25 March, it surpassed 400. On 31 March, it surpassed 800. The pandemic in Croatia occurred during the Croatian Presidency of the Council of the European Union.

On 22 March, an intense earthquake hit Zagreb, the capital of Croatia, causing problems in enforcement of social distancing measures set out by the Government. The earthquake could also be felt across much of Croatia, Bosnia and Herzegovina, Hungary, Slovenia, and Austria.

According to Oxford University, as of 24 March, Croatia was the country with the world's strictest restrictions and measures for infection reduction in relation to the number of infected. The government set up a website for all information about the virus and a new phone line 113 that has volunteers answering questions.

Cyprus 

On 9 March, Cyprus confirmed its first two cases, one in Nicosia and one in Limassol.

Cases reached 500 in April, 1,000 in July, 4,000 in October and 10,000 in November.

Czech Republic 

The first case was reported in the country on 1 March. As of 22 March there had been 1120 confirmed cases, with one lethal outcome.

On 12 March, the Czech Republic declared a 30-day state of emergency and barred entry to non-residents from China, South Korea, Iran, Italy, Spain, Austria, Germany, Switzerland, Sweden, UK, Norway, Denmark and France.

The Czech Republic banned people from going out in public without wearing a face mask or covering their nose and mouth.

Denmark 

On 27 February, Denmark confirmed its first case.

As of 16 March, there have been 898 confirmed cases in Denmark, including 11 in the Faroe Islands (see below).

Numerous preventive measures gradually were implemented. Starting on 13 March, schools, universities and similar places were closed, while most people in non-essential functions have been sent home to work. On 14 March, the borders were closed for all entries, except Danish citizens, people with a residence permit, people with an important reason for visiting, and transport of goods.

Estonia 

On 27 February, Estonia confirmed its first case, an Iranian citizen, travelling from Iran via Turkey.

As of 11 March, there were 17 confirmed cases in Estonia. 12 of them had returned with the infection from Northern Italy, one from France, one from Iran and one from undisclosed risk area. First two cases of virus transmitting locally were in Saaremaa after international volleyball competition involving a team from Milan.

From 12 March, the virus was spreading locally. The number of infected grew fast reaching 109 on 14 March.

Finland 

The first case was reported in the country on 28 January. As of 21 July there were over 7,000 confirmed cases. As of 9 December (2020) the confirmed cases in Finland are 28,732 over the entire period. A total of 433 deaths associated with the disease have been reported until now.

France 

On 24 January, the first case in Europe was confirmed in Bordeaux. Two more cases were confirmed in Paris by the end of the day, all of them originated from China. A cluster of infections was discovered in Haute-Savoie which originated from a British national who had visited Singapore.

From 31 January to 9 February, nearly 550 people were repatriated from Wuhan on a series of evacuation flights arriving at Creil Air Base in Oise and Istres-Le Tubé Air Base in Istres.

On 14 February, an 80-year-old Chinese tourist died in Bichat–Claude Bernard Hospital, Paris, marking the first death from COVID-19 in Europe and France.

According to regional council president Jean Rottner, the starting point for the first intense wave in Alsace was the Fasting Meeting of the Protestant Free Church of La Porte Ouverte in Mulhouse, with more than 2500 visitors, in mid-February.
On 12 March, French president Emmanuel Macron announced on public television that all schools and all universities would close from Monday 16 March until further notice. The next day, the Prime Minister Édouard Philippe banned gatherings of more than 100 people, not including public transportation. The following day, the prime minister ordered the closure of all nonessential public places, including restaurants, cafés, cinemas, and discothèques, effective at midnight.

As of 14 March, there had been 4,499 confirmed cases (a near-four-fold increase over the number 5 days previously), and 91 deaths in France.

As of 20 March, the number of confirmed cases had risen to 12,612, while the number of deaths reached 450.
As of 30 March, more than six hundred doctors and other medical workers are suing the former Minister of Health and the Prime Minister for "culpable negligence" in failing to prepare for the epidemic.

Until 1 April, the daily update of the number of deaths in France included only deaths in hospitals, with deaths in retirement homes or at home not included in the update. Deaths in retirement homes were included in the reported figures from 2 April, causing totals to increase substantially.

On 4 May, retroactive testing of samples in one French hospital showed a patient "who had COVID-19 as early as Dec. 27, nearly a month before the French government confirmed its first cases." According to the researchers who reported the discovery, this indicates that the virus was present in the population well before the first confirmed cases, a finding also echoed by US researchers. In July 2020, Prime Minister of France Jean Castex, announced that health care pay workers will see $9 billion in pay raises, as a result of their efforts during the coronavirus pandemic.

Germany 

In Germany, the first case of COVID-19 was recorded in the state of Bavaria on 27 January 2020. Daily case numbers began to decrease after 8 April, but rose sharply again in October.
 2,207,393 cases have been reported with 56,286 deaths and approximately 1,930,592 recoveries. The case fatality rate is 2.5%. The low preliminary fatality rate in Germany, compared to Italy and Spain, has resulted in a discussion and explanations that cite among others the country's higher number of tests performed, absence of COVID-19 analyses in autopsies and higher proportion of positive cases among younger people. Hessian state finance minister Thomas Schäfer committed suicide on 28 March 2020. State Premier Volker Bouffier said that Schäfer had had considerable worries in particular over the economic burden that the COVID-19 pandemic would place on the population.

Gibraltar 

First case was identified on 4 March 2020, only 187 cases to the end of July then increases with 100 added in August and the same in September. A contact App  "BEAT Covid Gibraltar" was released on 18 June.

Greece 

On 26 February, the first case in Greece was confirmed, a 38-year-old woman from Thessaloniki who had recently visited Northern Italy. The next day, the first patient's 9-year-old child and another 40-year-old woman, who had travelled to Italy, also tested positive. Subsequent cases is Greece were mainly related to people who had travelled to Italy and a group of pilgrims who had travelled to Israel and Egypt, as well as their contacts. Health and state authorities issued precautionary guidelines and recommendations, while measures up to that point were taken locally and included the closure of schools and the suspension of cultural events in the affected areas (particularly Ilia, Achaea and Zakynthos). The first confirmed death from COVID-19 in Greece was a 66-year-old man, who died on 12 March.

By 27 July there were 4,227 confirmed cases in Greece, some of which detected among tourists arriving to the country from mid-June onwards, 202 deaths and 3,562 recoveries. The Greek National Public Health Organization (NPHO), in collaboration with local authorities and doctors, is tracking and testing everyone who came in close contact with the patients. By 10 March, with 89 confirmed cases and no deaths in the country, the government decided to suspend the operation of educational institutions of all levels nationwide and then, on 13 March, to close down all cafes, bars, museums, shopping centres, sports facilities and restaurants in the country. On 16 March, all retail shops were also closed and all services in all areas of religious worship of any religion or dogma were suspended. On 18 and 19 March, the government announced a series of measures of more than 10 billion euros to support the economy, businesses and employees.

On 22 March the Greek authorities announced significant restrictions on all nonessential transport and movement across the country, starting from 6 a.m. on 23 March. Starting from 4 May, Greece has begun easing its lockdown restrictions after a 42-day lockdown, with the gradual lifting of movement restrictions and restart of business activity.

Guernsey

On 9 March, the first case in the Crown dependency was confirmed. On 27 May it was announced that there were no known active cases in the Bailiwick. There were no active cases for 129 days before an arrival from the UK tested positive on 6 September.

Hungary 

On 4 March Prime Minister Viktor Orbán announced that two Iranian students had been infected with the virus. The students are asymptomatic and have been transported to Saint Ladislaus Hospital in Budapest.

Iceland 

The first case was confirmed in Iceland on 28 February, an Icelandic male in his forties who had been on a ski trip to Andalo in Northern Italy and returned home on 22 February.

Iceland's Department of Civil Protection and Emergency Management declared a state of emergency on 6 March after two cases of community transmission in Iceland were confirmed, bringing the total number of confirmed cases to 43. On 13 March, it was announced at an official press conference that a four-week ban on public gatherings of more than 100 persons would be put into effect as of Monday 16 March. Universities and secondary schools will be closed for four weeks. International airports and harbours will remain exempt from these measures.

Ireland 

The National Public Health Emergency Team of Ireland announced the first case in the Republic of Ireland on 29 February, involving a male student from the east of the country, who had arrived there from Northern Italy. On 3 March, a second case was confirmed of a female in the east of the country who had been to Northern Italy. Response to the outbreak has included cancellation of St Patrick's Day parades and all festivals. On 11 March, an elderly patient in Naas General Hospital in County Kildare became Ireland's first fatality from the virus. On 12 March, Taoiseach Leo Varadkar announced the closure of all schools, colleges and childcare facilities. On 20 March, an emergency legislation was signed into law by President Michael D. Higgins giving the state permission to detain people, restrict travel and keep people in their homes to help combat the spread of the pandemic.

Lockdown

On 12 March, Taoiseach Leo Varadkar announced the closure of all schools, colleges and childcare facilities in Ireland until the end of August. On 27 March, Varadkar announced a national stay-at-home order for at least two weeks; the public were ordered to stay at home in all circumstances. All non-essential shops and services, including all pubs, bars, hotels and nightclubs closed and all public and private gatherings of any number of people was banned. The Garda Síochána (Irish police) were given power to enforce the measures, which were repeatedly extended until 18 May.

A roadmap to easing restrictions in Ireland that included five stages was adopted by the government on 1 May 2020 and subsequently published online. The fourth and final phase of easing COVID-19 restrictions in Ireland was initially scheduled to take place on 20 July, but was repeatedly postponed until 31 August at the earliest.

On 15 September, the Government announced a medium-term plan for living with COVID-19 that included five levels of restrictions.

All non-essential businesses and services closed and all public and private gatherings of any number of people was banned again on 21 October following the Government's announcement to move the entire country to Level 5 lockdown restrictions for six weeks until 1 December. On 27 November, the Government agreed to ease restrictions from 1 December.

A third wave of COVID-19 arrived in Ireland on 21 December. The Government acted swiftly and on 22 December, Level 5 lockdown restrictions with a number of adjustments were announced, which came into effect from Christmas Eve until 12 January 2021 at the earliest.

All non-essential businesses and services closed and all public and private gatherings of any number of people was banned again on 31 December (New Year's Eve) following the Government's announcement to move the entire country to full Level 5 lockdown restrictions from 30 December until 31 January 2021 at the earliest, in an attempt to get a third surge in cases of COVID-19 under control. On 26 January, the Government extended the Level 5 lockdown restrictions until 5 March. On 23 February, the Government extended the Level 5 lockdown restrictions for another six weeks until 5 April (Easter Monday) at the earliest, while its new revised Living with COVID-19 plan was published.

On 30 March, the Government announced a phased easing of restrictions from Monday 12 April. On 29 April, the Government announced a reopening plan for the country throughout May and June from 10 May, with a further reopening planned announced on 31 August that would see all remaining COVID-19 restrictions in Ireland eased by 22 October.

After a fourth wave of COVID-19 arrived in Ireland in October, the Government published on 19 October a revised plan for the easing of restrictions, with nightclubs allowed to reopen, however the continued use of masks, vaccine certificates and social distancing measures would remain in place until at least February 2022. On 3 December, the Government reintroduced a series of measures that would commence from 7 December amid concerns of the Omicron variant, with nightclubs to close, indoor cultural and sporting events to operate at 50% capacity and a maximum of four households allowed to meet indoors.

The Omicron variant caused a fifth wave of COVID-19 to arrive in late December and early January 2022, with record levels of cases reported over the Christmas and New Year period. As cases began to fall sharply, Taoiseach Micheál Martin announced on 21 January the easing of almost all COVID-19 restrictions, with the requirements of vaccine certificates and social distancing to end, restrictions on household visits and capacity limits for indoor and outdoor events to end, nightclubs to reopen and pubs and restaurants to resume normal trading times, while rules on isolation and the wearing of masks would remain. Remaining COVID-19 restrictions were agreed to be removed from 28 February, with mask wearing in schools, indoor retail settings and on public transport to be voluntary, restrictions in schools to end and testing to be scaled back.

As of 21 February 2022, the Department of Health have confirmed 1,276,778 confirmed cases and 6,443 deaths.

Italy 

On 31 January, the first two cases were confirmed in Rome. Two Chinese tourists, who arrived in Milan on 23 January via Milan Malpensa Airport and travelled to Rome on a tourist bus, tested positive for and were hospitalised in Lazzaro Spallanzani National Institute for Infectious Diseases.

On 6 February, one of the Italians repatriated from Wuhan, China, tested positive, bringing the total number of cases in Italy to three. On 22 February, the repatriated Italian recovered and was discharged from the hospital. On 22 and 26 February, the two Chinese tourists hospitalized in Rome tested negative.

On 21 February, a cluster of cases was detected starting with 16 confirmed cases in Lombardy, with additional 60 cases on 22 February, and Italy's first deaths reported on the same day. As of late February, Italy was hit harder than anywhere else in the EU by the COVID-19 pandemic.

By 17 March 2020, there were 2,503 deaths and 31,506 confirmed cases. By 15 May 2020, there had been 223,885 cases and 31,610 deaths, according to Protezione Civile bulletins.

On 3 June, Italy reopened its borders to EU residents and ended travel restrictions.

On 13 July, the Head of the ICU at a Bergamo hospital said that former patients treated for COVID-19 had developed serious long-term health issues.

Cases reached 100,000 in March, 200,000 in April, 300,000 in September, 600,000 in October and 1,600,000 in November.

Lockdown 

On 8 March, Italian prime minister Giuseppe Conte signed a decree enacting a quarantine for the entire region of Lombardy – home to more than 10 million people and the financial capital, Milan – and multiple other provinces, totalling around 16 million residents. The lockdown decree included the power to impose fines on anyone caught entering or leaving Lombardy, the worst-affected region, until 3 April.

On 9 March, the lockdown orders were extended to the whole of Italy, effectively quarantining more than 60 million people.

On 20 November 2020, according to high-frequency data, the lockdowns in France and Italy weighed down on public mobility more than in any other European country. France's official statistic agency INSEE found that the data collected by Google on the amount of time people spend at home is particularly closely correlated with the percentage of slow down experienced by an economy during the lockdown.

Jersey 

The first case was recognised on 10 March which resulted within days in flights and ferries being cancelled except for essential travel and freight, thus isolating the island by the end of March. By 30 June there were no active cases although there have since been small numbers of cases brought into the island when lockdown was relaxed and travel permitted. On 14 October a contact App was launched. Community contracted cases caused numbers to rise from 600 to 1,000 in November resulting in another lockdown.

Kosovo 

The first two cases in Kosovo were reported on 13 March. In the ten-day period 13–23 March, the number of positive cases with coronavirus rose to 35. In midnight of 23 March 26 new cases were confirmed, bringing the total number of cases to 61. On 25 March, the government collapsed with a vote of no confidence in Prime Minister Albin Kurti.

Latvia

Liechtenstein 

The first case was reported in the country on 3 March.

Lithuania 

The first case was reported in the country on 28 February. By 17 March there were 21 cases, mostly in Vilnius, Kaunas and Klaipėda. The first infected Lithuanian recovered on 14 March. Cases reached 2,000 in July, 10,000 in October and 50,000 in November.

Luxembourg 

The first case was reported in the country on 29 February. Positive cases exceeded 6,600 on 30 June and 8,500 on 30 September.

Malta 

On 7 March, Malta reported its first 3 cases of coronavirus: an Italian family consisting of a 12-year-old girl and her parents, who arrived in Malta on 3 March from Rome after a holiday in Trentino. Until around September, there were barely any cases; with that maximum cases per day at around 30. But then a big wave hit Malta and cases were being of over 100 everyday, and the most cases found in a single day was 510. Then in May 2021, the cases started calming down with Malta as of 20 June 2021 having just under 50 active cases, with over 30 thousand total.

Moldova

Monaco 

The first case was reported in the country on 29 February.

Montenegro

Netherlands 

On 27 February, the Netherlands confirmed its first case, a man who had been in the Lombardy region of Italy.

On 6 March, RIVM announced the first death.

On 9 March, RIVM announced 56 more confirmed cases in addition to the total of the 77 infected patients declared in the previous day, bringing the total to 321 infected and 3 dead.

On 15 March, the Dutch government announced in a press conference that all schools, day care facilities, colleges, universities, and universities of applied sciences would close until 6 April, though children of parents in vital industries could still go to school or the day care if they could not be taken care of otherwise.

As of 16 March, the total number of confirmed cases of COVID-19 had risen to 1,413 and the total number of confirmed deaths had risen to 24. This was an increase of 278 infections and 4 deaths in comparison to 15 March.

On the same date, the Prime Minister of the Netherlands, Mark Rutte, had announced that the country would not go into complete lockdown. Instead the situation would be controlled as much as possible by delaying the spread of the virus, relying on measures taken earlier by the government, such as social distancing and prohibiting gatherings of 100 people and over. It is expected the coronavirus will keep spreading and a large part of the population will become infected. Instead of opting to lock down the Netherlands for the time required, which would have many (negative) consequences while the benefits remain uncertain and would have to stay in place, it would be attempted to build herd immunity in a controlled manner. Depending on how the virus behaves, the government would decide if additional measures are required.

Further measures were introduced on 23 March. All events would be banned until 1 September. Gatherings of more than three people, except for families, were to be prohibited. City mayors received greater authorization to enforce the rules. Fines would be issued to those not complying with the new rules.

Cases reached 10,000 in March 2020, 50,000 in June 2020, 100,000 in September 2020, 500,000 in November 2020 and 1,000,000 in February 2021.

North Macedonia 

On 26 February, North Macedonia confirmed its first case, a woman that had returned from Italy. On 10 March every school, kindergarten and university was closed. As of 5 April 2021, the country has reported 134,867 cases, 3,940 deaths and a total of 109,297 recovered.

To stop the spreading of the virus, the country had a strict 61-hour curfew every weekend. For holidays, like Easter, the country had an 85-hour curfew. Furthermore, the state of emergency which had expired was extended for 14 more days until 30 May, and then again for 14 more days until 13 June.

Norway 

On 26 February, Norway confirmed its first case, in a person who had returned from China the previous week.

On 7 March, there were 147 confirmed cases in Norway. Most of the cases could either be linked to outbreaks abroad or close encounters with these. Altogether 89 have been infected on travel in Italy.

On 12 March 2020, all kindergartens, schools, colleges and universities were closed until at least 26 March 2020.

Poland

Portugal 

On 2 March, the first two cases were confirmed in Portugal, both in the city of Porto. One was a doctor who had returned from holiday in northern Italy, and the other a worker from Spain.

On 18 March, the President of the Republic, Marcelo Rebelo de Sousa, declared the entirety of the Portuguese territory in a state of emergency for the following fifteen days, with the possibility of renewal, the first since the Carnation Revolution in 1974.

On 24 March, the Portuguese government admitted that they could not contain the COVID-19 pandemic anymore, as it is wide spreading and will enter the 'Mitigation Phase' on 26 March.

Cases reached 10,000 in April, 100,000 in October and 300,000 in December.

Romania

Russia 

Russia implemented early preventive measures to curb the spread of COVID-19 in the country by imposing quarantines, carrying raids on potential virus carriers and using modern facial recognition technologies to impose quarantine measures.

On 2 March, Western Russia confirmed its first case in Moscow Oblast. Previously on 31 January Russia confirmed first two cases in its Asian part, one in Tyumen Oblast and another in Zabaykalsky Krai. Both were Chinese nationals, who have since recovered.

On 7 March, four new cases were confirmed, three was in Lipetsk and one in Saint Petersburg. All people visited Italy in the previous two weeks.

On 8 March, three news cases were confirmed, in Moscow, Belgorod and Kaliningrad Oblasts. All people returned from Italy.

On 10 March, Moscow Mayor Sergey Sobyanin signed a decree for banning mass events in Moscow with more than 5000 participants from 10 March to 10 April.

By 15 April, cases were confirmed in all of Western Russia's federal subjects with the confirmation of the first case in Nenets Autonomous Okrug.

San Marino 

On 27 February, San Marino confirmed its first case, an 88-year-old man with pre-existing medical conditions, who came from Italy. He was hospitalised at a hospital in Rimini, Italy. As of 25 March 2020: With 700 confirmed cases out of a population of 33,344 (as of 2018), it is the country with the highest percentage of confirmed cases per capita at % – 1 confirmed case per  inhabitants. Also, with 42 confirmed deaths, the country has the highest rate of confirmed deaths per capita at % of the total population – 1 death per  inhabitants.

Serbia

On 29 February, a massive infection occurred in the town of Valjevo after a private party involving a guest from Austria who had previously stayed in Italy. On 6 March, the first case was confirmed in Serbia by Minister of Health Zlatibor Lončar, of a man who had traveled to Budapest. President Aleksandar Vucic and the Government of the Republic of Serbia introduced a state of emergency on 15 March. Two days later, curfew and quarantine were introduced as safeguards against massive infection.

Slovakia 

On 6 March, Slovakia confirmed its first case, a 52-year-old man from a small village near Bratislava. He had not travelled anywhere in recent weeks but his son, who didn't show any symptoms, had visited Venice. On 7 March, the virus was also confirmed in his wife and son.

In October 2020, Slovakia started implementation of a short-period mass-testing programme to test two-thirds of its citizens for COVID-19.

Slovenia 

On 4 March Slovenia confirmed its first case. A patient of about 60 years of age had returned from Morocco few days earlier (via Italy) and was admitted to a hospital in Ljubljana.

On 6 March, a total of eight cases were reported, three of them medical professionals, who contracted the virus on holiday in Italy. By 9 March 16 people were confirmed to be infected.

Spain 

On 31 January, Spain confirmed its first case, in the Canary Island of La Gomera. A tourist from Germany tested positive and was admitted to University Hospital of the Nuestra Señora de Candelaria. On 19 February, 2,500 football fans from Valencia attended a Champions League game in Bergamo, the hot spot of the outbreak in Italy.

On 24 February, a medical doctor from Lombardy, Italy who was vacationing in Tenerife, tested positive at the University Hospital of the Nuestra Señora de Candelaria in Spain. Afterwards, multiple cases were detected in Tenerife involving people who had come in contact with the doctor. Other cases involving individuals who visited Italy were also discovered on Spanish mainland.

On Saturday 14 March, the Spanish government imposed a nationwide quarantine, banned all trips that are not necessary and announced that companies may be intervened to guarantee supplies. However, with universities and schools closed earlier that week, bars and parks were full, and due to slow enactment "part of the population of Madrid and other cities had dispersed across the country". As of 17 March 2020, there had been 11,826 confirmed cases with 1,028 recoveries and 533 deaths in Spain.

On 28 March, the Spanish government tightened up its national lockdown, ordering all non-essential workers to stay at home for the next two weeks. Nearly 900,000 workers lost their jobs in Spain since it went into lockdown in mid-March 2020. Public transport has also been greatly affected by the lockdowns and the severe restrictions established by the government. The relationship between the users who have continued using the urban bus and the characteristics of the stop's surroundings have been analysed.

On 10 January 2022, Spanish Prime Minister Pedro Sánchez initiated a debate in the European Union to treat COVID-19 as an “endemic illness” rather than a pandemic. He suggested a move towards a flu-like monitoring system amid falling death rates and hospitalisations on the European continent.

Sweden 

On 31 January, Sweden confirmed its first case. A woman in her 20s, who had visited Wuhan, tested positive and was admitted at Ryhov County Hospital in Jönköping.

On 26 February, following the outbreak in Italy and in Iran, infection clusters originating from these two countries appeared in Sweden. A number of individuals in Västra Götaland, Jönköping, Stockholm and Uppsala tested positive and were admitted to the infectious disease units in the respective counties.

The country's first fatality came on 11 March, that of a man in Stockholm over 60 who had other illnesses prior to infection.

As of 12 March, national testing strategy shifted to only the elderly, the severely ill, and healthcare personnel. The official recommendation for symptoms that were not serious, as of 13 March, was to stay at home and not visit healthcare. This has led to statistics becoming less useful.

As of 14 March 924 people were reported as having become infected. The Ministry for Foreign Affairs of Sweden made the recommendation to refrain from unnecessary travel to all countries.

On 22 January 2021 the Ministry of Justice of Sweden implemented travel bans from Denmark and the United Kingdom due to the mutation of SARS-CoV-2.

Switzerland 

On 25 February, following the outbreak in Italy, Switzerland confirmed its first case, a 70-year-old man in the Italian-speaking canton of Ticino, who had previously visited Milan. Afterwards, multiple cases related to the Italy clusters were discovered in multiple cantons including Basel-City, Zürich and Graubünden. Multiple isolated cases not related to the Italian clusters were also confirmed.

On 28 February, the Federal Council announced an immediate ban on all events with more than 1,000 participants.

As of 10 March, there were 500 confirmed cases in Switzerland.
On 16 March 2020, the Federal Council announced further measures, and a revised ordinance. Measures include the closure of bars, shops and other gathering places until 19 April, but leaves open certain essentials, such as grocery stores, pharmacies, (a reduced) public transport and the postal service. Those measures were prolonged until 26 April 2020.

On 23 December, following an unexpectedly quick authorization by Swissmedic of the Pfizer–BioNTech COVID-19 vaccine, the vaccination campaign was launched in several cantons. A 90-year-old woman from the Lucerne region became the first vaccinated patient in continental Europe outside Russia. All cantons are expected to start vaccinating by 11 January 2021.

Turkey

Ukraine 

December 2019:  Peter Attwood, an 84 year old from Chatham,Kent,England developed an unexplained respiratory illness in December 2019. His symptoms worsened and he was admitted to Medway Hospital on the 7th January 2020 and remained in hospital until his death on the 30th January 2020.
A follow-up pathology test of lung tissue taken during Peter's post-mortem examination showed he had had Covid-19 at the time of his death. 
Peter Attwood would appear to be the first known UK casualty of SARS CoV2.

United Kingdom 

On 31 January, England confirmed the first two cases, both members of a family of Chinese nationals staying in a hotel in York who were taken to specialist facilities in Newcastle upon Tyne. Afterwards, several confirmed cases were detected across the UK.
The UK government implemented preventive measures to curb the spread of infections which included contact tracing, isolation and testing, some of which were related to the Italy clusters. The NHS set up drive-through screening centres at several hospitals to test members of the public showing symptoms.

On 2 March, Ministers approved the Department of Health and Social Care COVID-19 action plan, which sets out actions to date, future measures, cooperation between devolved political and health authorities, and the level of preparedness of the country's four National Health Services. It outlined the government's objectives to deploy phased actions to contain, delay, and mitigate any outbreak, using research to inform policy development.

On 23 March, it was announced that the UK would be entering a nationwide lockdown. The public were advised to stay at home except for essential shopping and one hour of exercise a day. These measures came into effect on 26 March and lasted until 1 June when measures were eased allowing early years pupils and exams students to return to school in a limited capacity. These measures are further eased on 15 June when retail and attractions were able to open for the first time since March.

On 25 March, the UK Parliament legislated to provide the government and authorities with emergency powers to handle the COVID-19 pandemic, such as the power to restrict public gatherings, order businesses to close, and the ability to detain those suspected of having the virus. The Coronavirus Act 2020 received Royal Assent on 25 March and came into force on the same day.

On 5 April, the Prime Minister of the United Kingdom Boris Johnson was admitted to hospital after testing positive to COVID-19 10 days earlier. He was admitted into intensive care the following night, when his symptoms further worsened. He left hospital on 12 April.

The NHS was given access to emergency supplies of PPE and patients that did not need to remain in hospital were moved to residential care homes if needed. However, there was no need for a negative COVID-19 test before patients were transferred to these settings, this was only required from 15 April. On 15 May, the government approved the first social care specific legislation that helped to ensure that staff had access to adequate PPE and protect both those working and living in care homes.

As of 6 May, the total of confirmed cases was 201,101; the total of recorded deaths in all settings was 30,076, the highest in Europe and second highest in all the countries after the United States. It is estimated that care home residents accounted for 30–40% of these deaths, with social care workers being twice as likely to die from COVID-19 as the general population. However, the death toll did not continue to increase throughout the summer, and Brazil and Mexico now have more deaths as of 1 August 2020.

During August and September, the number of infections per day began to increase significantly although the death rate remained fairly low. Boris Johnson announced changes to restrictions on 22 September which included forcing pubs, bars and restaurants to close by 10 pm in England and the so-called rule of six saying no more than six people should meet. In October, Scotland's first minister declared new restrictions it meant that some areas of the country those like Edinburgh had to close bars, pubs and go back to doing self-service. Northern Ireland's executive that also have control over health policy tightened restrictions to make them close to a lockdown as did Wales announced by Welsh first minister. It also emerged that Boris Johnson had been advised by SAGE committee of scientists to have a short lockdown back on 21 September. Johnson subsequently introduced a three-tier system of restrictions Liverpool was put under the top tier meaning tougher restrictions but falling short of a full lockdown. The UK has since recorded over 40,000 deaths.

On 5 November, the UK had to enter a second national lockdown due to the rising number of cases and hospitalisations. Following the end of this lockdown on 2 December case numbers began to rise again and over 70,000 deaths have been recorded in relation to COVID-19 as of 11 December 2020. On 4 January 2021, Prime Minister Boris Johnson addressed the nation announcing a third lockdown. The UK went into Lockdown that day due to rapidly increasing numbers of cases and deaths caused by a new more infectious variant of COVID-19 spreading around the UK.

The UK has begun to vaccinate its population against COVID-19. The first vaccine, the Pfizer/BioNTech vaccine for COVID-19, was approved for use in the UK on 2 December 2020, the first of the 800,000 immediately available doses was administered on 8 December. The second vaccine approved for use in the UK was the Oxford University/AstraZeneca COVID-19 vaccine, which was approved for use on 30 December 2020, with the first dose of this vaccine given on 4 January 2021. A third vaccine, the Moderna vaccine, was approved for use in the UK on 8 January 2021, and the first dose was administered in Wales on 6 April.

Vatican City

Pandemic development graphs

Confirmed cases and deaths by date
Confirmed cases by date

Deaths by date

Total confirmed cases since first day of the outbreak

Growth rates comparison since outbreak 

Syncing the start date to the 10th case, comparing the daily growth in cases

Syncing the start date to the 10th case, comparing the daily deaths

Daily new cases; syncing the start date to the 100th case:

Daily new cases; syncing the start date to the 500th case:

Response and criticism

Immigrants and refugees
The European Union closed borders to non-nationals on 17 March. The next day, Greece imposed restrictions on refugees’ movement within camps. Thousands of asylum seekers are living in crowded camps, and there are fears that pandemic could not be controlled under such conditions. The Greek prime minister K. Mitsotakis said that Europe should do more to help because Greece "cannot resolve this crisis instantly and alone". Unnamed Greek officials have stated concerns that Turkey may send infected refugees and migrants towards the islands. Early in April Malta and Italy closed their ports to vessels carrying asylum seekers from North Africa.

Vaccination

In early 2021, EU commission chief Ursula von der Leyen was criticised for the EU's slow rollout, and she noted that the EU was “late to authorise” and said that ordering vaccines on behalf of member states was “the right thing to do”.
Some countries withheld recommending the AstraZeneca vaccine due to concerns of blood clots.  By 20 June 2021, nearly half the population of the European Union had received at least one dose of COVID-19 vaccination.

In November 2021, a study by the ECDC estimated that 470,000 lives over the age of 60 had been saved since the start of vaccination roll-out in the European region.

Herd immunity through infection in Iceland

On 23 February 2022, the Ministry of Health lifted all remaining COVID-19 restrictions, including gathering limits, restricted opening hours for bars, and border restrictions.  Adopting a herd immunity approach, the ministry stated that “widespread societal resistance to COVID-19 is the main route out of the epidemic,” and “to achieve this, as many people as possible need to be infected with the virus as the vaccines are not enough, even though they provide good protection against serious illness”.

Criticism

Travel bans and border closures

Although by 7 March some European politicians such as France's Marine Le Pen had called for Europe's internal borders to be temporarily closed, the European Union by 13 March continued to reject the idea of suspending the Schengen free travel area and introducing border controls with Italy. The deputy leader of the Swiss Ticino League, Lorenzo Quadri, by 29 February had criticised the decision, saying, "It is alarming that the dogma of wide-open borders is considered a priority." United States President Donald Trump said by 12 March the European Union had "failed to take the same precautions and restrict travel from China and other hot spots" as the US had implemented. Trump also said that "As a result a large number of new clusters in the United States were seeded by travellers from Europe." Research on coronavirus genomes indicates the majority of COVID-19 cases in New York came from European travelers, rather than directly from China or any other Asian country.

By 9 March, Czech Prime Minister Andrej Babiš stated that "European countries cannot ban the entry of Italian citizens within the Schengen area. The only possible way is to have the Italian prime minister call on his fellow citizens to refrain from traveling to other countries of the European Union."

After Slovakia, Denmark, the Czech Republic and Poland announced complete closure of their national borders, the European Commission President Ursula von der Leyen said by 12 March that "Certain controls may be justified, but general travel bans are not seen as being the most effective by the World Health Organization. Moreover, they have a strong social and economic impact, they disrupt people’s lives and business across the borders." European Union leaders condemned the US decision to restrict travel from Europe to the United States. European Council President Charles Michel and Ursula von der Leyen said in a joint statement: "The European Union disapproves of the fact that the US decision to impose a travel ban was taken unilaterally and without consultation." Ursula von der Leyen admitted by 17 March that "all of us who are not experts initially underestimated the coronavirus."

As of 22 February 2021, the UK has banned direct flights from 33 countries, including Portugal, South Africa, Peru and the United Arab Emirates. All travelers entering the UK via indirect flights have been ordered to quarantine in a designated hotel for 10 days. Since passengers coming from high-risk countries with South African virus’ mutant (like the UAE and South Africa) are mixing with other travellers before reaching their accommodation, this travel ban is being criticised extensively.

EU solidarity

The Italian government has criticised EU's lack of solidarity with Italy. Politico reported on 7 March that "EU countries have so far refused Italy's plea for help fighting coronavirus, as national capitals worry that they may need to stockpile face masks and other medical gear to help their own citizens, officials and diplomats said." Maurizio Massari, Italy's ambassador to the EU, said that "Only China responded bilaterally. Certainly, this is not a good sign of European solidarity." Serbian President Aleksandar Vučić said that "European solidarity does not exist. That was a fairy tale."

Eventually, in July 2020 the European Council agreed to a massive recovery fund of 750 billion € branded Next Generation EU (NGEU) to support member states hit by the COVID-19 pandemic. The NGEU fund goes over the years 2021 – 2023 and will be tied to the 2021–2027 budget of the EU (MFF). The comprehensive packages of NGEU and MFF will reach the size of 1824.3 Billion €.

In response to the pandemic, the European Investment Bank Group is establishing a €25 billion Pan-European Guarantee fund. It is projected that the guarantee fund would raise up to €200 billion.

Reaction time of Spain 

According to The Guardian, Spain's initially slow response to COVID-19 caused the epidemic to become severe even though it did not share a land border with Italy or other severely affected countries. An analysis in Vox hypothesised that the minority government did not want to risk its hold on power by banning large gatherings early; Prime Minister Pedro Sánchez initially defended his decision to allow large gatherings to continue.

Military exercises during pandemic
The planned NATO "Defender 2020" military exercise in Germany, Poland, and the Baltic states, the largest NATO war manoeuvres since the end of the Cold War, was to be held on a reduced scale because of the COVID-19 pandemic. The Campaign for Nuclear Disarmament's general secretary Kate Hudson criticised the Defender 2020 exercise: "In the current public-health crisis, it jeopardises the lives not only of the troops from the US and the many European countries participating but the inhabitants of the countries in which they are operating."

Restrictions on civil liberties
There was concern that measures taken by some national governments on occasion of the COVID-19 pandemic would have the aim or effect of restricting democracy and civil liberties and rights. In Hungary, prime minister Viktor Orban acquired near absolute powers through such legislation on 3 April.

Use of scientific advice
The European Union's Chief Scientific Advisors issued a statement on 24 June 2020, providing guidance for how scientific advice should be given and interpreted during the pandemic. One key point made by the Advisors was that scientists must be clearer about the degree of uncertainty that characterises the evolving evidence on which their advice is based, for instance around the use of face-masks. They also emphasised that scientific advice must be separated from decision-making, and this separation must be made clear by politicians.

In April 2021, the leaders of the Society for Aerosol Research warned the debate on COVID-19 measures does not reflect current scientific knowledge. They said protection against infection must take place above all where people spend time indoors, because "the transmission of the SARS-CoV-2 viruses takes place almost without exception indoors."

Notes

References

External links 

 WHO Coronavirus Disease (COVID-19)
 Worldwide Coronavirus Map, confirmed Cases – Map the route paths of coronavirus confirmed cases.
 ncov – CSSE – Map of the expansion of the virus in Europe and in the world

 
Europe
Health disasters in Europe
2020 disasters in Europe
2021 disasters in Europe
2022 disasters in Europe
Articles containing video clips